František Mráček (born 13 April 1914, date of death unknown) was a Czech wrestler. He competed in the men's Greco-Roman light heavyweight at the 1936 Summer Olympics.

References

External links
 

1914 births
Year of death missing
Czech male sport wrestlers
Olympic wrestlers of Czechoslovakia
Wrestlers at the 1936 Summer Olympics
Place of birth missing